Bernard Jones (born 10 April 1934) is an English former professional footballer who played as a forward. During his career, he made 95 appearances in the Football League for Northampton Town, Cardiff City and Shrewsbury Town.

References

1934 births
English footballers
Footballers from Coventry
Northampton Town F.C. players
Cardiff City F.C. players
Shrewsbury Town F.C. players
English Football League players
Association football forwards
Living people